Saint-Aignan may refer to :

Catholic saints
 Saint Aignan of Orleans (358–453), Bishop of Orléans, France, feast day 17 November
 Saint Aignan, Aegnanus, or Aman, of Besançon (died c. 374), Bishop of Besançon, feast day 5 September
 Saint Aignan of Chartres (5th century), Bishop of Chartres who allegedly did not exist and whose portrayed life was based on the one of Saint Aignan of Orléans

Places in France
Saint-Aignan, Ardennes
Saint-Aignan, Gironde
Saint-Aignan, Loir-et-Cher
Saint-Aignan, Sarthe
Saint-Aignan, Tarn-et-Garonne
Saint-Aignan, Morbihan
Mont-Saint-Aignan, in the Seine-Maritime department
Saint-Aignan-de-Couptrain, in the Mayenne department
Saint-Aignan-de-Cramesnil, in the Calvados department
Saint-Aignan-des-Gués, in the Loiret department
Saint-Aignan-des-Noyers, in the Cher department
Saint-Aignan-Grandlieu, in the Loire-Atlantique department
Saint-Aignan-le-Jaillard, in the Loiret department
Saint-Aignan-sur-Roë, in the Mayenne department
Saint-Aignan-sur-Ry, in the Seine-Maritime department

Nobility
A line of family members bearing the title of comte de Saint-Aignan:

 Honorat de Beauvilliers, comte de Saint-Aignan (1579-1622), whose life was saved by Charles de Blanchefort at the Battle of Ponts-de-Cé (1620)
A line of family members bearing the title of Duke of Saint-Aignan :
 François de Beauvilliers, 1st duc de Saint-Aignan (1610-1687), first in line to be elevated to dukedom by Louis XIV of France
 Paul de Beauvilliers, 2nd duc de Saint-Aignan (1648-1714)
 Paul-Hippolyte de Beauvilliers, duke of Saint-Aignan (1684-1776)

See also
Saint-Agnan (disambiguation)
Saint-Agnant (disambiguation)